See
 List of birds of Bosnia and Herzegovina
 List of mammals of Bosnia and Herzegovina

See also 
 Outline of Bosnia and Herzegovina

References